The Men's individual road race events at the 2008 Summer Paralympics took place on September 13–14 at the Changping Triathlon Venue.

Handcycle classes

HC B 

The Men's individual road race HC B event took place on September 14. The race distance was 48.4 km.

HC C 

The Men's individual road race HC C event took place on September 14. The race distance was 48.4 km.

Cerebral palsy /locomotor disability classes

LC 1/LC 2/CP 4 

The Men's individual road race LC 1/LC 2/CP 4 event took place on September 13. The race distance was 72.6 km.

LC 3/LC 4/CP 3 

The Men's individual road race LC 3/LC 4/CP 3 event took place on September 13. The race distance was 60.5 km.

Blind & visually impaired class

B&VI 1-3 

The Men's individual road race B&VI 1-3 event took place on September 13. The race distance was 96.8 km.

Legend: DNF = Did Not Finish; DNS = Did Not Start; OVL = Overlapped.

References

Cycling at the 2008 Summer Paralympics